Mahia is a township in New Zealand. Other meanings include:

Places

Mahia, Bihar, a village in Darbhanga district, Bihar, India
Māhia Peninsula, Hawke's Bay, New Zealand
Mahia Beach, a township on Māhia Peninsula
Rocket Lab Launch Complex 1, also known as Mahia Spaceport, on Māhia Peninsula
Mahia (New Zealand electorate)
Mahia, Nigeria, in Adamawa state, Nigeria
Mahia Park, a suburb of Auckland, New Zealand
Te Mahia, Auckland, New Zealand
Te Mahia Railway Station
Te Mahia Bay, an arm of Kenepuru Sound, New Zealand
Te Mahia Saddle, a high point on New Zealand's Queen Charlotte Track

People
Mahia Blackmore, New Zealand singer
Adrián Mahía, Argentinian footballer
Irene Mahía, Spanish television presenter
, Uruguayan politician 
Mahia Nagib, Yemeni journalist

In fiction
Mahia, in the film The Decks Ran Red (1958)
Mahia, in the film She Gods of Shark Reef (1958)

Food and beverages

Mahia (drink), a traditional Moroccan Jewish alcoholic beverage made from dates

Other
Mahia (folk music), a variety of Punjabi folk music
Mahia (Jal song), a 2007 song by Pakistani band Jal
Gor Mahia F.C., a Kenyan football club
Mahia whiptail, a species of fish